Giman (also Romanized as Gīmān; also known as Kīmān) is a village in Bazman Rural District, Bazman District, Iranshahr County, Sistan and Baluchestan Province, Iran. At the 2006 census, its population was 1,339, in 261 families.

References 

Populated places in Iranshahr County